Lorenzo Gabellini (born 9 September 1999 in Rimini) is a professional motorcycle racer from Italy. In 2020, he competed in the Superbike World Championship aboard a Honda Fireblade with Althea Mie Racing for less than half of the season until the Altea management split from their race-team partner, Moriwaki in late August.

He won the 2019 Italian CIV Supersport 600 championship.

References

External links 
 Profile at WorldSBK.com

Italian motorcycle racers
Living people
1999 births
Superbike World Championship riders
Sportspeople from Rimini
Supersport World Championship riders